Rock Me Baby is an American sitcom that aired on UPN from September 16, 2003 until May 25, 2004. Set in Denver, Colorado, the show stars Dan Cortese as Jimmy Cox, co-host of a popular Denver radio show with his best friend, Carl, played by Carl Anthony Payne II. Bianca Kajlich plays Beth Cox, Jimmy's wife, and the two have a baby named Otis. Tammy Townsend plays Beth's best friend, Pamela, who is obsessed with the glamorous life.

Plot
Rock Me Baby is about a former exotic dancer, Beth, and a radio personality, Jimmy, who produce a child together, with most of the storylines of each episode revolving around the baby, Otis. Throughout the beginning of the series, Carl has a crush on Pamela and is rejected on every attempt to gain closure with her. Jimmy and Beth overcome a series of obstacles about being new parents and the phases of life.

Cast and characters 
 Dan Cortese as Jimmy Cox, the co-host of Denver Radio show, Khor
 Tammy Townsend as Pamela, a friend of Beth Cox and girlfriend of Carl
 Bianca Kajlich as Beth Cox, a former exotic dancer, wife of Jimmy Cox and stay at home mother of Otis Cox
 Carl Anthony Payne II as Carl, a co-host of the Denver Radio show Khor, and best friend of Jimmy Cox

Episodes

Production 
Rock Me Baby was aired by UPN. The series was a production of Warner Bros. Television

Casting 
The casting was Deedee Bradley, Megan Branman, Reyna Karp and Susan Vash. The primary focus was the baby who would play as "Otis Cox".  Scenes with 'Otis' made it challenging for the rest of the cast as opposed to doing them with an older child, teenager or adult. And filming in a scene, many factors occur such as adapting to any possible noises and crying and having added responsibility. Keeping the baby occupied whilst doing the scene to prevent any outbursts is also a primary concern which can be very challenging. Nicole Richie was a guest star.

Filming 
Main scenes are primarily the open-space apartment of Jimmy and Beth Cox's kitchen, dining and living area and the sound room inside the radio station of where Jimmy and Carl host their radio show, Khor. Usually after each show, the ending scene will be in Jimmy and Beth's bedroom while they lay in bed and speak to each other about the day. Other scenes also include restaurants, Pamela's bedroom, Otis' bedroom, a rooftop of a building, a school administration office, a school performance art stage and a live music stage within the radio station building which are all featured in Denver, Colorado, but filmed in Los Angeles, California, USA.

Opening theme 
The opening theme is "Rock Me Baby" by Matter which is an up-beat rock song.

The closing theme is the instrumental version used for the closing theme. Samples of the instrumental song is used to open and close from adverts.

Broadcast 

In the USA the pilot episode of Rock Me Baby debuted on the UPN network on Monday September 15, 2003. The second episode 'Coupling' aired on September 23, 2003 and the following episodes followed exactly one week later. The last episode for the first series was 'Singing for your Supper' which aired on May 25, 2004. After the first season, UPN decided to cancel production of Rock Me Baby.

In Australia Rock Me Baby debuted on Australia's Nine Network in 2006 and aired on Friday mornings at 2:30 AM.

Reception
TV Guide wrote of the series, "Dismal, even by UPN standards".

References

External links
 

UPN original programming
2003 American television series debuts
2004 American television series endings
2000s American sitcoms
English-language television shows
Television series by Warner Bros. Television Studios
Television shows set in Colorado
Television series about radio